The People's Party of Extremadura (PP) is the regional section of the People's Party of Spain (PP) in Extremadura. It was formed in 1989 from the re-foundation of the People's Alliance.

Electoral performance

Assembly of Extremadura

Cortes Generales

European Parliament

People's Party (Spain)
Political parties in the Region of Murcia